SAAM II (an abbreviation of "Simulation Analysis and Modeling" version 2.0) is a proprietary and US NIH-funded software that was developed by SAAM Institute in 1997 at the University of Washington in Seattle. SAAM II is a computer program for tracer and pharmacokinetic studies. It is used for compartmental modeling and noncompartmental analysis. Compared to similar software, compartmental models are constructed graphically allowing the quick run of simple systems or the creation of complex (linear and nonlinear) structures. The main uses are in metabolic diseases and pharmacokinetics.

History
University of Washington working through its Resource Center for Kinetic Analysis in the Center for Bioengineering, rewrote code for a software package called SAAM (I or 1.0), which had been developed in the late 1950s and early 1960s at the National Institutes of Health and at other research sites in the United States. The original SAAM was a powerful research tool to aid in the design of experiments and the analysis of data. Its dictionary permitted compartmental models to be developed without formally specifying the differential equations. However, SAAM was developed before the era of modem computer software design and implementation techniques, and as a result, it was not user-friendly. In addition, the computational kernel was not well documented, which made validation, maintenance, and further enhancements difficult.  In 1995 Prof David Foster led the re-writing of the SAAM code, including a strategic user interface, which generated SAAM II. A particular boost to SAAM II was then given by both Prof Foster and Dr. Vicini's labs furthering the development and support to version 2.1, plus the creation of a Population pharmacokinetics plug-in, called PopKinetics. The Epsilon Group have updated SAAM to the current version 2.3, with bugs fixing, graphic improvements, and the creation of the Mac version. Now, SAAM II is distributed by Nanomath LLC, a Washington company held by Dr. Simone Perazzolo a modeler and scientist at University of Washington Pharmaceutics.

Features
It has a user-friendly graphical user interface wherein compartmental models are constructed by creating a visual representation of the model. From this model, the program automatically creates systems of ordinary differential equations (ODEs). The program can both simulate and fit models to data, returning optimal parameter estimates and associated statistics. It is composed of a compartmental and numerical module.

The compartmental module
In the compartmental module, the user can choose from a set of drag and drop model-building icons representing compartments, transfers (0th-order, linear, Michaelis–Menten kinetics, etc.), and delays to build a visual representation of a system on a drawing canvas. For each icon, attributes can be defined using dialogue boxes. To simulate the behavior of the model, an experiment must be created (model conditions). Using the drag and drop experiment-building icons, the user directly specifies inputs and sampling sites. Each has an attribute box where, for example, measurement equations are written and associations with data elements are made. The example of a two compartmental model for the oral absorption of a candidate drug (#1) and the plasma elimination (#2) is depicted in Figure 1. Note that the input (dose) is in the digestive compartment 1, while the output (observations) is made in the plasma compartment 2. The Compartmental Module is the most used feature of SAAM II.

The non-compartmental module (numerical module)
The Numerical module is also available but less frequently used; it lets you write directly the equations of the model or model directly the data by predefined functions. The latter allows you to carry out a non-compartmental analysis of the data.

Main computational algorithms 
For ODE solving it uses 3 types of integrators: RK 4-5th order, something like ode45 in MATLAB; a method based on the Pade approximation of the matrix exponential; and typical Rosenbrock methods. Paremeter optimization is based on Gaussian-Newton algorithm.

An appreciated feature of SAAM is the creation of a weighting scheme based on the supposed measurement error as well as the Bayesian fitting. When selected, the Bayesian fitting is particularly powerful in parameter estimation accuracy. SAAM allows the estimation of complicated structures even where theoretical structural identification is not successful or too complex to assess. However, when the model tends to hard unidentifiability, SAAM pops a message as the precision of the estimates is not computable. This is a commonsense and practical feature of SAAM which gives an important leeway in parameter fitting of rather complex structures with few data observations, whereas other fitting software fails.

Validation
A validation of the software (numerical) performance was carried out against the industry gold-standard PK analysis software, Phoenix WinNonlin. In general, there was good agreement (<1% difference) between SAAM II and WinNonlin in terms of parameter estimates and model predictions

popKinetics plug-in
popKinetics is an add-on to SAAM II and a powerful simulator to simulate the PK of a drug in populations with variability in data and model parameters. It was funded by the NIH for the population analysis of the compartmental models built in SAAM II. It has a user interface that is easy to use (no programming or pseudo-code is needed). It computes the Standard Two-Stage and Iterated Two-Stage approaches for population parameters with their confidence intervals. Few if any assumptions about the population are necessary prior to analysis. For example, clinical trials can be simulated to determine the effect of varying dosing regimens.

Impact and notable work
The Type 1 Diabetes Simulator (AKA, Padua-Virginia Simulator) allows the simulation of the glucose and insulin profile of a type 1 diabetic. In 2008 the US Food and Drug Administration accepted the T1D simulator developed by University of Virginia and University of Padova as a substitute for preclinical trials for certain insulin treatments, including closed-loop algorithms for artificial pancreas. Cobelli and Kovatchev labs prototyped the simulator in SAAM II.

Classic pharmacokinetic studies using SAAM II are by Foster and Vicini labs, while more complex lipid dynamics studies are by Barrett lab in Australia.
SAAM II is currently employed for prototyping PBPK models. When complex mechanisms participate in the PK of new drugs or formulations, SAAM II can be used for rapid in vivo testing. Perazzolo and colleagues in Seattle use SAAM II jointly with experimental data to inform nanoparticle PBPK and the clinical transition of long-acting or extended-release therapies.

Education
SAAM II is present in several curricula in Universities in the US and around the world, especially in biomedical engineering and pharmacy courses, such as USC Mann School of Pharmacy or UCLA bioengineering.

References

Bioinformatics software
University of Washington projects